The Copa de Oro Argentina was a Spanish football competition, held once on 23 December 1945 as a one-off game between FC Barcelona (winner of the 1944–45 La Liga) and Athletic Bilbao (winner of the 1944–45 Copa del Generalísimo), with Barcelona winning 5–4 at their Camp de Les Corts stadium.

The match was organised by the Catalan Football Federation on the initiative of the Argentine consulate in Barcelona, with the trophy being provided by the city's Argentine community.

It was the second super cup in Spanish football, after the one-off Copa de los Campeones de España in 1940. In  1947, the first official tournament was played, the Copa Eva Duarte which ran to 1953. The current Supercopa de España began in 1982.

Participants

Match details

References

1945–46 in Spanish football
Defunct football cup competitions in Spain
Defunct national association football supercups
FC Barcelona matches
Athletic Bilbao matches
1940s in Barcelona
History of football in Spain